Shatrughan Kumar Yadav (born 15 March 1986), known professionally as Khesari Lal Yadav, is an Indian actor, singer, dancer  and model primarily working in Bhojpuri cinema. Also known by the Initialism KLY, Khesari has appeared in more than 70 films including one Bollywood film, and performed as vocalist in more than 5000 songs. Apart from Bhojpuri, he has also worked in Hindi, Awadhi and Haryanvi languages.

Born in Chhapra, Bihar, Yadav began his singing career in late 2000s and has had a steady acting career since appearing in Saajan Chale Sasural in 2011. He made his Bollywood debut as a singer in 2014 with "AK-47" in the film Koyelaanchal. He won Best Popular Actor at the 2016 Bhojpuri Film Awards, followed by Best Actor (Male) and Best Playback Singer (Male) at the Sabrang Film Awards in 2018 for his appearance in Mehandi Laga Ke Rakhna. In 2019, he won four more awards for his role in the film Sangharsh. In 2019, he participated in the reality show Bigg Boss 13.

In 2020, his third Bollywood song and first Bollywood single ladki patana released by Sony Music India which was followed by Tere Mere Darmiyaan in 2021. Soon after, He collaborated with Badshah to recreate the Pani Pani song in Bhojpuri language. In 2022, he made his debut as a screenwriter with his film Aashiqui. YouTube featured his two songs it's list of Top Indian songs of 2022.

Life
Khesari Lal Yadav was born as Shatrughan Kumar Yadav on 15 March 1986 in Dhanadih village of Saran district of Bihar in a poor family. He got the stage name "Khesari", due to his habit to speak too much as a child, which was analogous to Khesari, a crop, which doesn't need any water or Fertilizer, and grows properly anywhere.

He was not born in his own house, as his parents' mud house had collapsed in the rain, and they had to rent a pucca house, where Khesari was born. His father, Mangaru Lal Yadav, worked as a street vendor selling Chana in the mornings and as a security guard at night to make ends meet. Khesari is one of seven siblings, three of whom are his own brothers. The other four are his uncle's sons, whose mother passed away at an early age. Khesari's mother stepped in to raise them. His father used to earn in Delhi and he used to live with his mother and uncle in Chhapra. Later his mother also left for Delhi to help her husband with household works and Khesari started living with his siblings and uncle. Khesari used to graze Cattles and sell their milks in his childhood. He is married to Chanda Devi, whom he married in 2006. Khesari Lal is said to be extremely devoted to his wife, calling her his lucky charm. They have a son and a daughter. 

During 1998-99 Khesari started his career as a theatre artist in Bhojpuri theatres, where he used to sing in Ramayana and Mahabharata, he also learnt the Bhojpuri folk dance Launda Naach. Later he also moved to Okhla, Delhi, where he started selling Litti Chokha with his parents and wife. With the money saved after selling Litti-chokha, He launched his first album by spending ₹12,000 but it was a big flop. After that he started working as a servant in Guddu Rangeela's house, who was a famous Bhojpuri singer in those days, after savings some money, he again spent ₹25,000 to launch his second album which got better response from audience and he got some fame. After that he started getting investments in projects from various music companies, but he had to do the marketing by his own. He told in many of his interviews that he himself used to promote his album cassettes in many districts of Bihar and UP, he used to go by train and wherever singing and dancing programs were held during the day or at night. He used to give some money to the sound operator there and ask him to play his song. He told that some people would agree but some people used to abuse and ask them to leave. He also told that sometimes he did not even have money to eat, so he used to sleep without eating.

After getting success as a singer, he moved to Mumbai to work in films. Khesari have disclosed that, the manager of Manoj Tiwari had kept him at Tiwari's house secretly. He learnt fight in this period and then Aalok Kumar starred him in Sajan Chale Sasural, which became a hit and established him as an actor.

Acting career

Early years (2012–2016) 
In 2012, he made his acting debut in Bhojpuri film Sajan Chale Sasural, in which he played the lead role as Sajan, a village boy who goes to town to marry the girl with which his marriage had fixed in his childhood. His second film was Jaan Tere Naam, in which he played the character of a boy who want to be an actor. Akshaya Kumar, in one of his articles, writes that "the film sets in motion a dialogue about cultural practices that defy the feudal family and awaken its ‘deviant’ anxieties". Between 2012 and 2016 he did 42 Bhojpuri movies including Nagin (2012), Ae Balma Biharwala (2013), Chhapra Express (2013), Pratigya 2 (2014)  and Khiladi (2016), which won four awards at Sabrang Film Awards 2017.

Establishment and Bollywood debut (2016–present) 

In 2016, he made his Bollywood debut in the movie Global Baba, in which he sang a song titled "holi me ude" and performed in it too with Sandeepa Dhar and Pankaj Tripathi. For his role in Mehandi Laga Ke Rakhna (2017); which is a remake of the Telugu film Aadavari Matalaku Arthale Verule; he won the awards for best actor and best playback singer at Sabrang Film Awards 2018. After doing  films like Mai Sehra Bandh Ke Aaunga (2017), Muqaddar (2017), Damru (2018), Dulhan Ganga Paar Ke (2018), he appeared in Sangharsh (2018), which was a film with a social massage supporting the slogan Beti Bachao, Beti Padhao. The film won 19 awards at different award shows. In 2018, Khesari starred in Naagdev, which was the first ever Bhojpuri film to use Vfx. VFX was used in nearly 40% of the movie scenes and it was the first Bhojpuri film to use VFX. His other films in this period are Balam Ji Love You (2018), Dabang Sarkar (2018), Coolie No. 1 (2019). His film Baaghi- Ek Yoddha was a patriotic movie which also talked about the Muzaffarpur shelter case. He also did a sports film named Bhag Khesari Bhag (2019). In 2019, He also made his television debut by participating in the reality show Bigg Boss as a contestant.

His movie Mehandi Laga Ke Rakhna 3 (2020) is the remake of the Tamil film Velaiilla Pattadhari. His Dulhan Wahi Jo Piya Man Bhaye (2021) was his first movie to be shot abroad, 90% of the film was shot in London. His three more film in 2021 were shot abroad; Chori Chori Chupke Chupke and Pyar Kiya to Nibhana were shot in London whereas Saiyaan Arab Gaile Na was shot in Dubai.

His first release of 2022 was Aashiqui, in which he also made his debut as screenwriter and played the role of an upper caste boy who goes against the traditional values for his love. He next featured in Shadi Ho To Aisi which released in May. He next featured in Dulhaniya London Se Layenge which was shot in London and his co-actors were British Artist Grace Rhodes and Madhu Sharma. His next film Rowdy Inspector released on different dates in parts of India in August 2022, the movie is directed by Telugu director Shankar. Meghasri acted in the female lead with Khesari and this was her Bhojpuri debut movie. In August 2022, He made his Haryanvi debut with Sapna Chaudhary in the music album Matak Matak. His next Bhojpuri film Doli Saja Ke Rakhna released in September 2022. The film got many screens across India and Nepal including 25 Multiplexes. On 24 October, his film Bol Radha Bol released. His last film of 2022 was Raja Ki Aayegi Baraat, which released in December.

His first film of 2023 was Farishta, which released on 9th April. Khesari played the character of a Mentally Challenged person in this film.

Music career 

In his early days, he used to sing in the Ramayan and Mahabharat. His first album was released in 2008. Some of early famous songs are Saiyaan Arab Gaile Na, Piyawa Rahele Saudi Re Bhauji, Maal Bhetai Mela Me. In 2014, he made his Bollywood Debut as a singer in the song "AK-47" from Koyelaanchal. In 2016 he sang his second Bollywood song Holi Me Ude for the film Global Baba. In 2017, he won the award of Best Playback Singer, at Sabrang Film Awards. His notable songs that year were Kawna Devta Ke Garhal Sawaral and Jaan Gaini E Ho Jaan. In 2018, he released in one of the most popular songs Thik Hai from the single "Premika Mil Gail". In 2020, he released his third Bollywood song and first Single Ladki Patana produced by Sony Music India.

2021 
In 2021, his second Bollywood single Tere Mere Darmiyaan (In between I and You) was released. Khesari collaborated with Bollywood Rapper Badshah in the Bhojpuri version of the famous Hindi song Pani Pani, originally sung by Aastha Gill and Badshah himself. The Bhojpuri version was released under Saregama and Badshah rapped in Bhojpuri language. The song received more than one million views within 60 minutes of being uploaded on YouTube, and became the first Bhojpuri song to do so. He worked with singer and Composer Shipra Goyal in his next Bollywood single Romantic Raja, choreographed by Mudassar Khan and lyrics written by Kunaal Vermaa. His other Hindi single was Tedhi Hai Par Meri Hai and Bhojpuri singles were Ladkiyo Ka Rog Na Paalo, Naya Saal Naya Maal.

2022 
He sang the song Do Ghoont which was his first Bhojpuri single of 2022. The song was the remake of the song Do Ghut Mujhe bhi Pila De Sharabi from the 1973 Bollywood film Jheel Ke Us Paar. Soon after he released another single Aashiq (Lover), video of which was shot in Germany. After releasing some Holi songs, he released Dream Me Entry. He sung six songs in his film Aashiqui and released 23 Holi songs. He further released a Chaita song Le Le Aain Coca Cola (transl.: Bring Coca cola) which topped the global YouTube music chart. Another Bhojpuri single Nathuniya (The Nose ring) also made it to top 5 in the chart. His first Hindi single of the year, Kamariya Coca Cola released in April 2022 by T-Series.

He sang on Salim–Sulaiman's composition "Tsunami", a Hindi song released in June 2022. In the same month he released one more Hindi single "Unke Dil Me'' (In Her Heart). He further released Bhojpuri single "UP Bihar", followed by a Hindi single "Ya Khuda" (O lord) in August. He further recreated the famous Bengali song "Bondhu Teen Din" (Buddy! Three days) in Bhojpuri. Khesari, then released two Hindi singles; First was "Baarish" (Rain) which released on October 9, 2022, featuring two Armenian models, Par and Seda. The video was also shot in Armenia. The second was "Mehfil" with which he made his debut as a Composer too. He sung a sad Bhojpuri single "Dil Tutal Hoi". In first week of November, his single "Tabla" released. His Nathuniya and Le Le Aain Coca Cola got featured in YouTube annual list of Top Indian songs in 2022.

2023 
His song, "Pagale Bana Di Ram Ji" from the film Farishta received good response from the audience and received over 3.6 million views within 24 hours of release.

Other works

Brand endorsements
In 2022, the Italian motor vehicle manufacturer Piaggio made Yadav their brand ambassador.

Stage performances 
He regularly performs in stage shows across all over India.

Body building
Khesari is fond of bodybuilding, every day he spends hours in gym.

Philanthropy and service 
Yadav runs an NGO called "Khesari Foundation" which does charitable works across the country. He is the guardian of 62 orphan children and pays for their education. He visits an old age home every month and helps the flood victims of Bihar every year. Before Diwali in 2022, he distributed money to the needy.

Popularity, struggle and criticism

One of the reasons of Khesari's popularity and stardom is due to his Lavanda Naach performaces. Even before his film debut, he was popular for his performances as Launda. Since Launda Naach is seen as taboo by the upper caste and undermines the performer's masculinity, Khesari was mocked for his performances and his masculinity was frequently questioned. Akshaya Kumar, sees his popularity form Launda Naach as a rebellion against the tag of universal disdain for the performer among the upper caste. Kumar, further mentions an interview of a Brahmin Classical music teacher from Buxar, who lauded Manoj Tiwari and Pawan Singh, but on the mention of Khesari, He said "what is he, he is mere a launda". Khesari takes very bold position on this matter however, in an interview to Jogira in 2013 he said:

Kumar sees his popularity as, a pre-eminent force that shapes other competing masculinities of Bhojpuri order. According to him, Khesari surpasses his peers only by re-constituting the gender stereotypes, and this appearing as the pre-eminent rebellious figure.

Filmography

Bhojpuri

Story/screenwriter 
 Aashiqui - 2022

Hindi

Films

Television

Haryanvi

Music videos

Awadhi

Films

Discography

Film songs

Bhojpuri

Hindi

Non-film songs

Bhojpuri

Hindi

As a composer 

 Mehfil

Awards

References

External links
 

1986 births
Living people
Male actors from Bihar
Male actors in Bhojpuri cinema
People from Siwan district
Singers from Bihar
Bigg Boss (Hindi TV series) contestants